Jinan Olympic Sports Centre Gymnasium is an indoor sporting arena located in Jinan, China.  The capacity of the arena is 12,000 spectators.  It hosts indoor sporting events such as basketball , gymnastics, badminton and volleyball, and also hosted the indoor events of the 2009 National Games of the People's Republic of China.

See also
List of indoor arenas in China

References

External links
Official website 
Arena information

Indoor arenas in China
Sports venues in Shandong